The supplementary vote (SV) is an electoral system used to elect a single winner, in which the voter ranks the candidates in order of preference. In an election, if no candidate receives an absolute majority of first preference votes, then all but the two leading candidates are eliminated and there is a second count. In the second count, the votes of those who supported eliminated candidates are distributed among the two remaining candidates, so that one candidate achieves an absolute majority.

It is a specific implementation of the contingent vote and instant-runoff voting. Under supplementary vote, voters express first and second ranked choices of candidate only, and, if no candidate receives an absolute majority of first-choice votes, all but the two leading candidates are eliminated. If a voter's first-choice candidate is eliminated but their second-choice is one of the two remaining candidates then their vote is transferred to the second-choice candidate. The candidate with the most votes is the winner. The supplementary vote was used in all elections for directly elected mayors in England, including the Mayor of London, and in elections for police and crime commissioners until 2022 when it was replaced by first-past-the-post voting (FPTP).

History and current use
In the early 1990s, the Plant Commission was established by the Labour Party, which was then in opposition, to recommend a new voting system for the Parliament of the United Kingdom. When the Commission reported in 1993, instead of suggesting an already existing system, it recommended the Supplementary Vote (SV) system, which had never been used anywhere. Although some commentators credit the invention of SV to Plant, it was actually the brainchild of the then Labour Member of Parliament (MP) for Workington, Dale Campbell-Savours, who advocated and outlined it in an article he wrote for an issue of the left-leaning New Statesman magazine that was published four years before Plant reported, on September 29, 1989.

However, it never became official Labour Party policy to introduce SV for national elections in the United Kingdom. Prior to 2000, there were no directly elected mayors in England but, when direct elections were introduced for some mayors, it was decided to use SV and was used for the direct election of eleven English mayors, including the Mayor of London and was also used for election of police and crime commissioners across much of England and Wales. In 2022 the use of SV for these elections was scrapped and replaced with first past the post.

However, a similar system was already in use since 1978 to elect mayors in Israel. Usually, the electoral system functions as a Two-round system, under which if no candidates have 40% or more of the votes or if all first-placed candidates receive an equal number of votes, a runoff would be held 14 days later. However, if both candidates in the runoff receive an equal number of votes, the number of first-round votes is then added to the number of runoff votes, and the candidate who receives the higher number of votes in both rounds wins. If even after the supplementing stage both candidates receive an equal number of votes, the deadlock would be broken by the City Council, which will then elect one of the candidates as Mayor, as it did under the pre-1978 system.

Impact on factions and candidates 
The Supplementary Vote is said to encourage candidates to seek support beyond their core base of supporters in order to secure the second preferences of the supporters of other candidates and so to create a more conciliatory campaigning style among candidates with similar policy platforms. SV is also likely to improve the chances of 'third party' candidates by encouraging voters who wish to do so to vote sincerely for such candidates where under systems such as 'first past the post' they would be discouraged from doing so for tactical reasons.

These positive effects are partly moderated by the incentives SV creates for voting, in some circumstances, for only candidates from among the leading three.

Rallings et al. have noted two flaws of SV:
 First, since the automatic dual-ballot nature of SV dispenses with any need for a runoff two weeks later – as often happens for, say, the election of the president of France – voters go in casting their second preferences without certainty of which candidates will make the runoff. Consequently, some second preferences will be declared invalid because they have been cast for eliminated candidates.
 Second, it is possible for the victor to fail to achieve an absolute majority overall, since it is not an obligation for a voter to cast a second preference, and a second preference will be ineffective if it is cast for a candidate who does not make it into the top two.

Like any system that elects a single representative, including other forms of the contingent vote, the Supplementary Vote is not a form of proportional representation. For that reason, if it were used to elect individual members of a council or legislature, it could be expected to produce the kind of one-party-dominant results that are produced by other single-seat systems like 'first past the post' (plurality). The difference though would be that election of representatives by only a minority of a district's voters happens often under FPTP but less likely under SV.

See also
Ranked voting systems
History and use of instant-runoff voting
Tactical manipulation of runoff voting
Elected mayors in the United Kingdom
List of democracy and elections-related topics
Alternative vote
Alternative Vote Plus
Single transferable vote

Notes

References

External links
Democratic and Electoral Shifts in Queensland (PDF)
London Elects: How the Mayor of London is Elected
Electoral Systems Index: Sri Lanka

Contingent vote
Single-winner electoral systems
Preferential electoral systems
Non-monotonic electoral systems